The Ministry of Youth, Sport, Arts and Recreation is a cabinet ministry of the government of Zimbabwe. The position was created by President Emmerson Mnangagwa following his cabinet formation in December 2017 when he split Higher Education and Primary and Secondary Education into two separate government agencies, the latter being responsible for sports and the arts prior to this move.

The minister is former Olympic swimmer and record holder Kirsty Coventry.

References

Government of Zimbabwe
Zimbabwe